Homogyna spadicicorpus is a moth of the family Sesiidae. It is known from Zambia.

References

Endemic fauna of Zambia
Sesiidae
Fauna of Zambia
Moths of Africa
Moths described in 1919